General elections were held in Japan on 7 October 1979 to elect the 511 members of the House of Representatives. Prime Minister Ōhira Masayoshi's announcement that a consumption (sales) tax would be imposed was a hot-button issue in the run-up to the election. Facing widespread public disapproval, the prime minister abandoned the tax proposal. The prime minister's party, the Liberal Democratic Party (LDP), ended up losing one seat, while the Japan Communist Party experienced a surge in voter support and its best ever electoral result, which mostly came at the expense of the Japan Socialist Party and the LDP-breakaway New Liberal Club.

This was the first election in the LDP's history in which the party increased its share of the popular vote compared to the previous election.

Results

By prefecture

References

Japan
General elections in Japan
1979 elections in Japan
October 1979 events in Asia
Election and referendum articles with incomplete results